John Steven Pramesa (August 28, 1925 – September 9, 1996) was an American professional baseball player, a catcher in the Major Leagues from – for the Chicago Cubs and Cincinnati Reds.

In 1950, his best MLB season, Pramesa batted .307 in 74 games played and 228 at bats, with a career-high 30 runs batted in.

External links

1925 births
1996 deaths
Major League Baseball catchers
Chicago Cubs players
Cincinnati Reds players
Anderson A's players
Bristol Twins players
Des Moines Bruins players
Jacksonville Tars players
Jersey City Giants players
Los Angeles Angels (minor league) players
Manchester Giants players
Springfield Cubs players
Syracuse Chiefs players
Toronto Maple Leafs (International League) players
Trenton Giants players
Baseball players from Ohio
Baseball players from West Virginia
People from Belmont County, Ohio